Dmitry Ioffe (April 5, 1963 - October 1, 2020) was an Israeli mathematician, specializing in probability theory.

Biography
Dmitry Ioffe obtained his diploma from the Moscow Mining Institute in 1985 and his PhD in Mathematics in 1991 from the Technion, under the supervision of Ross Pinsky. He then spent a post-doc at the University of California, Davis and the Courant Institute. He was an assistant professor at Northwestern University (1993-1995) and a researcher at the Weierstrass Institute of Analysis and Stochastics (WIAS) in Berlin (1995-1997), before returning to the Technion, where he spent the rest of his life as professor. From 2014, he was the incumbent of the Alexander Goldberg chair in management sciences.

Scientific work
Ioffe made fundamental contributions to several areas of statistical mechanics, including random interface models, interacting particle systems, polymers in random environments, random perturbations of dynamical systems, metastability and homogenization. In particular, he extended the Dobrushin-Kotecky-Shlosman two dimensional Wulff construction to the full range of subcritical temperatures and developed with Bodineau and Velenik a robust analytic alternative that worked also in higher dimension. With collaborators, he developed the Ornstein-Zernike theory (at temperatures above criticality) and introduced a diamond representation for a range of models including self-avoiding walks, Bernoulli percolation, Ising ferromagnets and polymers. 
He also made important contributions to the analysis of quantum spin systems and metastability.

Personal life
Ioffe’s family applied for permission to leave the USSR for Israel in 1976 but was refused and hence he became refusenik.  It was only in 1987, following a hunger strike by his father, mathematician Alexander Ioffe, that Dmitry and his family were allowed to emigrate.

Prizes and honors
Ioffe got the Prix de l’Institut Henri Poincare (2005)  and a Humboldt research award (2011).

Selected publications

References

External links
Dmitry Ioffe, Low temperature interfaces and level lines in the critical prewetting regime, CIRM
Dmitry Ioffe, Technion.
Dmitry Ioffe, Minerva foundation Obituary.
Obituary: Medallion lecturer Dmitry Ioffe,Institute of Mathematical Statistics.
Obituary to Dmitry Ioffe, Bonn University.

Israeli mathematicians
1963 births
2020 deaths